Clarence Addison Dykstra (February 25, 1883 – May 6, 1950) was a U.S. administrator. He served as the first City Manager in the US in Cincinnati, Ohio after teaching government at the University of Chicago. He then became Chancellor of the University of Wisconsin (1937–1945) as well as Director of the Selective Service System between 1940 and 1941. He then became Provost of UCLA from 1945–1950.

He also served as the Efficiency Director of the City's Department of Water and Power for Los Angeles before World War II. He argued that the city needed to be further decentralized by expanding highways and creating suburban communities.

Dykstra was appointed by President Roosevelt to chair the 11-member National Defense Mediation Board, an effort to settle wartime disputes. He served from March 19 to July 1, 1941.

Clarence Dykstra  was also the first to advocate student housing at UCLA. Dykstra Hall, which opened in 1959, was the first structure in UCLA's current undergraduate residential community. It was also the first co-ed residence hall in the country.

Notes

1883 births
1950 deaths
Conscription in the United States
Leaders of the University of Wisconsin-Madison
Leaders of the University of California, Los Angeles
American people of Frisian descent
Franklin D. Roosevelt administration personnel